Grodzisko in Sopot is an early medieval settlement in the city of Sopot surrounded by ramparts and a moat, covered with beech forest. Operates as a heritage park and is a department of the Archaeological museum in Gdańsk.

Sopot
Archaeological sites in Poland

csb:Archeologòwi Skansen Zómkòwiszcze w Sopòce